Chad is a landlocked country in Central Africa. Chad's currency is the CFA franc. In the 1960s, the Mining industry of Chad produced sodium carbonate, or natron. There have also been reports of gold-bearing quartz in the Biltine Prefecture. However, years of civil war have scared away foreign investors; those who left Chad between 1979 and 1982 have only recently begun to regain confidence in the country's future. In 2000 major direct foreign investment in the oil sector began, boosting the country's economic prospects.

Notable firms 
This list includes notable companies with primary headquarters located in the country. The industry and sector follow the Industry Classification Benchmark taxonomy. Organizations which have ceased operations are included and noted as defunct.

See also
 Economy of Chad

References 

 
 
Chad